Gongrodiscus is a genus of shrubs and trees in the family Sapindaceae.  The genus is  endemic to New Caledonia in the Pacific and contains three species. It is related to Sarcotoechia and Storthocalyx.

List of species
 Gongrodiscus bilocularis 
 Gongrodiscus parvifolius 
 Gongrodiscus sufferugineus

References

Endemic flora of New Caledonia
Sapindaceae genera
Sapindaceae